Milagros de la Vega (1895–1980) was an Argentine stage and film actress.

Selected filmography
 Malambo (1942)
 The Sin of Julia (1946)
 Women's Refuge (1946)
 Stone Horizons (1956)
 Odd Number (1962)

References

Bibliography
 Peter Cowie & Derek Elley. World Filmography: 1967. Fairleigh Dickinson University Press, 1977.

External links

1895 births
1980 deaths
Argentine television actresses
Argentine film actresses
Argentine stage actresses
People from Buenos Aires